Benjamin Munson is a professor and chair of Speech-Language-Hearing Sciences University of Minnesota. His research relates to relationships among speech perception, speech production, and vocabulary growth in children. The bulk of his research has examined how speech perception, production, and word knowledge interact during development in typically developing children, in children with Speech Sound Disorder, in children with Developmental Language Disorder, in adult second-language learners, and in adults with age-related hearing impairment.  He has also studied how people convey and perceive sexuality through phonetic variation.  

In research presented at the American Association for the Advancement of Science in 2018, he revealed that the voices of boys and girls were identifiably different even before puberty with the boys' voices being lower and boys that were gender dysphoric showing traits more associated with women.

Munson received his BA in Russian and Political Science from State University of New York at Buffalo (1992), his MA in speech-language pathology from Ohio State University (1997) and his PhD in speech and hearing science also from Ohio State. Prior to entering academia, he was a political activist. He was arrested at the 1992 Republican National Convention while protesting President George H.W. Bush with the group ACT-UP (he can be seen yelling "what about AIDS?" at the 2:40 mark in this C-SPAN video). Following this event, he served a brief sentence at the Harris County Jail.

References

External links
https://www.researchgate.net/profile/Benjamin_Munson/2
https://www.c-span.org/video/?c4548554/aids

Living people
Year of birth missing (living people)
University of Minnesota faculty
University at Buffalo alumni
Ohio State University alumni
Sociolinguists